The 2010 Men's World Floorball Championships Qualifying Rounds were the first such qualifiers for world championships in men's floorball. Four separate qualifying tournaments were played, with European qualifications between the dates of February 3 to February 6, 2010 in the cities of Babimost and Zbąszyń in Poland, as well as in the city of San Lorenzo de El Escorial in Spain.

The 2010 Men's Asia Pacific Floorball Championships served as the qualifying tournament for countries in the Asian/Oceanian region. The tournament was overseen by the Asia Oceania Floorball Confederation (AOFC), and was played in Woodlands, Singapore. It was played between February 3 to February 7, 2010.

North American qualification matches between Canada and the United States were played in Hamilton, Ontario, Canada from February 5 to February 6, 2010.

These were the first world championships under the IFF's new FIFA-like continental qualification system. A total of 32 countries registered for this event, which is the most nations to ever register for an IFF-sanctioned world championship event. The previous record was 29 for the 2008 Men's World Floorball Championships.

Qualification process
Under the IFF's new qualification system, the 32 countries registered for the world championships needed to qualify for only 16 spots. 8 of these spots were already pre-determined, with the top 7 teams from the 2008 Men's World Floorball Championships A-Division and the top team from the B-Division automatically qualifying. This left just 8 spots for the other 24 registered countries.

Depending on the number of countries registered per continental region, that many slots were given at the world championships.

The countries already qualified are as follows:

Asian & Oceanian process

Qualifying in the Asia/Oceanian region for the world championships was overseen by the Asia Oceania Floorball Confederation (AOFC).

Only 3 out of 5 registered AOFC countries will qualify. The 5 countries are as follows:

European process
Only 4 out of 16 countries registered in Europe qualified. The 16 countries are as follows:

North American process
Only 1 out of 2 countries registered in North America qualified. The 2 countries are as follows:

Groups
Ballots for the groups in this event were drawn on May 9, 2009 during one of the semi-final matches of the 2009 Men's under-19 World Floorball Championships in Turku, Finland.

In the way the ballots were drawn, no team qualifying from the AOFC will play against each other in group stage matches, and no team qualifying from Europe will either.

The groups will be assembled based on qualifying as follows:

Final groups

Withdrawals

India
India withdrew from world championships due to financial difficulties on January 21, almost 2 weeks before the tournament began. In turn, the AOFC and IFF were forced to make changes to the schedule to accompany the other teams.

Georgia
Although Georgia never withdrew from the world championships, they were not able to show up to their first match against Slovakia, resulting in an automatic walkover win of 5:0. This was due to flight problems caused by inclement weather.

Tiebreaking criteria
For the three game group stage of this tournament, where two or more teams in a group tied on an equal number of points, the finishing positions are determined by the record of the tied teams in the games they played against each other in the first instance, then the goals scored and goal difference in all group matches. There is a facility for positions to be determined by a drawing of lots should 2 (or more) team records be identical and their match was a draw against each other.

A win is worth 2 points, a draw is worth 1 point, and a loss is worth 0 points. No sudden victory overtime or penalty shootout will be played in the preliminary round, as matches ending in draws at the end of regulation will award both teams with a single point. Matches which are draws at the end of the playoff round will, however, continue with a sudden victory overtime period and a possible penalty shootout.

European Qualifying (Poland)

The European Qualifying tournament in Poland determined which 2 teams received a spot in the 2010 World Championships. For this qualifying tournament, the winning teams received a spot in Group A (West Europe 1) or Group B (West Europe 2), depending on their position in preliminary stage play.

Teams in this qualification tournament represented Western Europe, as the IFF used the same criteria they use for EuroFloorball Cup qualifications in order to determine groups.

Preliminary round

Group A
All matches in Group A in the preliminary round were played in Zbąszyń, Poland.

February 3, 2010

February 4, 2010

February 5, 2010

Group B
All matches in Group B in the preliminary round were played in Babimost, Poland.

February 3, 2010

February 4, 2010

February 5, 2010

Playoff round
At this stage in the tournament, there was no playoff bracket. Instead, the first placed team from group A faced the second placed team from group B, and vice versa. The winners of these two matches qualified for the 2010 World Championships. These matches were played in Babimost, Poland.

West Europe 1 Final

West Europe 2 Final

Placement matches
At this stage in the competition, third placed teams from both groups played against each other, as well as the fourth placed teams, to determine world rankings as they did not qualify for the world championships. These matches were played in Zbąszyń, Poland.

Seventh Place match

Fifth Place match

European Qualifying (Spain)

The European Qualifying tournament in Spain determined which 2 teams received a spot in the 2010 World Championships. For this qualifying tournament, the winning teams received a spot in Group C (East Europe 1) or Group D (East Europe 2), depending on their position in preliminary stage play.

Teams in this qualification tournament represented Eastern Europe, as the IFF used the same criteria they use for EuroFloorball Cup qualifications in order to determine groups.

All matches in the preliminary round, playoffs, and placement rounds were played in San Lorenzo de El Escorial, Spain.

Preliminary round

Group C

February 3, 2010

*Note: Slovakia was awarded a 5:0 walkover win over Georgia.

February 4, 2010

February 5, 2010

Group D

February 3, 2010

February 4, 2010

February 5, 2010

Playoff round
At this stage in the tournament, there was no playoff bracket. Instead, the first placed team from group C faced the second placed team from group D, and vice versa. The winners of these two matches qualified for the 2010 World Championships.

East Europe 1 Final

East Europe 2 Final

Placement matches
At this stage in the competition, third placed teams from both groups played against each other, as well as the fourth placed teams, to determine world rankings as they did not qualify for the world championships.

Seventh Place match

Fifth Place match

Asian/Oceanian qualifying

The Asian/Oceanian Qualifying tournament in Singapore determined which 3 teams received a spot in the 2010 World Championships. For this qualifying tournament, a winning team received a spot in Group B (AOFC 1), Group C (AOFC 3), or Group D (AOFC 2), depending on their position in preliminary stage play.

Teams in this qualification tournament represented the Asia Oceania Floorball Confederation (AOFC). This tournament was also known as the 2010 Men's Asia Pacific Floorball Championships.

There was only a preliminary round in this tournament, and the top 3 teams at the end of the round qualified for the 2010 World Championships. No placement matches were played.

Originally scheduled to play in the tournament, India withdrew due to financial difficulties.

All matches were played in Woodlands, Singapore.

Group E

February 3, 2010

February 4, 2010

February 5, 2010

February 6, 2010

February 7, 2010

North American qualifying

The North American Qualifying rounds of the 2010 World Championships took place in Hamilton, Ontario, Canada, from February 5 to February 6, 2010. 2 matches were played, and the winner advanced to the 2010 World Championships based on aggregate scoring.

Although the tournament is for North American qualifying, it was previously set up by the IFF for qualifying for the Americas, which would have included both North and South America.

Criticism
Only two teams out of four eligible teams registered for this event, those being Canada and the United States. The other two eligible teams were Argentina and Brazil. Brazil is the only team in the Americas which has yet to take part in an IFF-sanctioned world championship event, as Argentina was given a wild card to take part in the C-Division of the 2008 Men's World Floorball Championships.

Out of these two teams, only one would qualify and receive the North America slot in Group A at the 2010 World Championships. This format has drawn a lot of criticism from floorball media, as both Canada and the United States have consistently finished at the top of their respective divisions at previous world championships, but were unable to advance due to the IFF's poorly structured division advancement/relegation format.

However, even if all four eligible teams registered, only one slot at the world championships would have been given, which drew criticism as Asian/Oceanian qualifications give three slots at the world championships to six out of ten eligible teams.

It is believed that the IFF may change their continental qualification format for the 2012 Men's World Floorball Championships.

Group F

*Note: Standings table is provided only for statistical comparison, as qualifying in this group was based on aggregate scoring rather than ranking.

February 5, 2010

February 6, 2010

See also
2010 Men's Asia Pacific Floorball Championships
2010 Men's World Floorball Championships

Citations

|-style="text-align: center; background: #ffa07a;"
|align="center" colspan="3"|Men's World Floorball ChampionshipsContinental Qualifying – Host Cities

External links
European qualification (Poland) – Schedule & Statistics
European qualification (Spain) – Schedule & Statistics
Asian/Oceanian Qualification – Schedule & Statistics
North American Qualification – Schedule & Statistics
2010 Men's World Floorball Championships – Schedule & Statistics

2010, Men's Qualifying
Mens World Floorball Championships Qualifying, 2010
Floorball
Floorball
Floorball
Floorball
Floor